Campobase is a regionalist and centrist political party in Italy, mainly active in Trentino, founded by Lorenzo Dellai.

Electoral results

Italian Parliament

References

Christian democratic parties in Italy
Catholic political parties
2022 establishments in Italy
Regionalist parties in Italy
Political parties established in 2022